Tuni is a town in Andhra Pradesh, India.

Tuni or TUNI may also refer to:
 TUNI, Tampere Universities, in Finland
 Tuni (footballer), Spanish footballer
 Tuni language (Ivory Coast)
 Tunni language, spoken in Somalia
 Tuni (Assembly constituency), centred on the Indian town
 Tuni railway station, Andhra Pradesh, a railway station in the Indian town of Tuni
 Tuni railway station, Adelaide, a railway station in Australia
 Mulla Alaul Maulk Tuni, a 17th-century Iranian architect

See also 
 Toonie, a Canadian coin